In mathematics, specifically functional analysis, a pth Schatten-class operator is a bounded linear operator on a Hilbert space with finite pth Schatten norm.  The space of pth Schatten-class operators is a Banach space with respect to the Schatten norm.

Via polar decomposition, one can prove that the space of pth Schatten class operators is an ideal in B(H). Furthermore, the Schatten norm satisfies a type of Hölder inequality: 

 

From this it follows that ,   is a well-defined contraction. (Here the prime denotes (topological) dual.)

Observe that the 2nd Schatten class is in fact the Hilbert space of Hilbert–Schmidt operators. Moreover, the 1st Schatten class is the space of trace class operators.

Operator theory